The name Ziauddin is a common transliteration of the male Muslim given name more correctly written Ḍiya ad-Dīn. It means the “Shine of the Religion” It may refer to:

Diya al-din Abu al-Najib al-Suhrawardi, (1097 – 1168), Persian Sufi
Diyā' ad-Dīn Ibn Athir (1163 - 1239), Arab writer and literary critic
Diya al-Din al-Maqdisi (died 1245), Hanbali Islamic scholar
Ziya' al-Din Nakhshabi (died 1350), Persian physician and Sufi living in India
Ziauddin Barani (1285 - 1357), Indian historian and political philosopher
Ziauddin Ahmad (1878 – 1947), scholar and politician in colonial India
Seyyed Zia'eddin Tabatabaee (1888 – 1969), Prime Minister of Iran
Ziauddin Ahmad Suleri, known as Z. A. Suleri (1913 - 1999), Pakistani journalist and writer
Diaa al-Din Dawoud (1926-2011), Egyptian politician 
Ziauddin Sardar (born 1951), Pakistani writer on Islam
Ziyaettin Doğan or Ziya Doğan (born 1961), Turkish football manager
Ziauddin Rizvi (died 2005), Shi'a cleric from Gilgit
Ziaeddin Niknafs (born 1986), Iranian footballer
Ziaeddin Tavakkoli, Iranian politician
Ziauddin Butt, a Pakistani military officer jailed as a result of the 1999 Pakistani coup d'état
Qari Ziauddin, Afghan militia leader
Ziauddin (Afghan militia leader), Afghan militia leader
Ziauddin (cricketer), Pakistani cricketer

See also
Ziauddin Pur, census town in India
Qarah Zia od Din, town in West Azarbaijan province, Iran
Dr. Ziauddin Group of Hospitals, hospital group in Pakistan named in honor of Ziauddin Ahmed
Ziauddin Medical University, medical school in Karachi, Pakistan named in honor of Ziauddin Ahmed

Arabic masculine given names